Country School is a 1931 animated short film by Walter Lantz Productions and stars Oswald the Lucky Rabbit.

Plot 
Oswald and his girlfriend Kitty are going to school, but are late. The teacher later plays a song for all of the students, but a hippo blows a raspberry at the teacher and puts a balloon in Oswald's shorts, so the teacher smacks Oswald, at which the balloon burst. The teacher announces that school is dismissed, then finally everyone runs back home.

References

Oswald the Lucky Rabbit cartoons
1931 animated films
1931 films
1930s American animated films
Universal Pictures animated short films
Films set in schools
Animated films about cats
American black-and-white films
1930s English-language films